Makrani may refer to:
 Makrani people, an ethnic group in Pakistan of African-descent.
 Makrani caste, an Indian social group
 Makrani dialect, a variety of Balochi